Podocarpus novae-caledoniae is a species of conifer in the family Podocarpaceae. It is found only in Grande Terre and the Île des Pins, New Caledonia.

Habitat and ecology
This species is usually found along watercourses running through maquis shrublands.

References

novae-caledoniae
Least concern plants
Taxonomy articles created by Polbot